Vanderbeck House, also known as the Daughters of the American Revolution Chapter House, is a historic home located at Rochester in Monroe County, New York. It is a three-story brick structure with a slate-covered mansard roof and a foundation of sandstone blocks.  It was built in 1874 in the Second Empire style.  In 1959, the single family home was converted to offices and apartments.

It was listed on the National Register of Historic Places in 1984.

References

Houses in Rochester, New York
Houses on the National Register of Historic Places in New York (state)
Second Empire architecture in New York (state)
Neoclassical architecture in New York (state)
Houses completed in 1874
National Register of Historic Places in Rochester, New York